was a , built for the Imperial Japanese Navy immediately following World War I. Advanced for their time, these ships served as first-line destroyers through the 1930s, but were considered obsolescent by the start of the Pacific War.

History
Construction of the large-sized Minekaze-class destroyers was authorized as part of the Imperial Japanese Navy's 8-4 Fleet Program from fiscal 1917-1920, as an accompaniment to the medium-sized  with which they shared many common design characteristics. Equipped with powerful engines, these vessels were capable of high speeds and were intended as escorts for the projected s, which were ultimately never built. Shiokaze, built at the Maizuru Naval Arsenal, was the eighth ship of this class. The ship was laid down on 15 May 1920, launched on 22 October 1920 and commissioned on 29 July 1921.

On completion, Shiokaze was assigned to the Yokosuka Naval District. On 9 March 1928 she was conducting torpedo launch trials off Yokosuka Bay when she collided with the submarine I-21, which was at sea carrying out speed trials.  There were no casualties aboard either ship, but both vessels suffered light damage; I-21′s bow was bent 60 degrees to starboard, forcing her to proceed to Yokosuka for repairs.

In 1938 and 1939, Shiokaze conducted patrols of the southern coastline of China in support of Japanese combat operations in the Second Sino-Japanese War.

World War II history
In World War II, Shiokaze performed patrol and convoy escort duties. At the time of the attack on Pearl Harbor, Shiokaze (assigned to Destroyer Division 3 of the IJN 1st Air Fleet) was based at Palau, as part of the escort of the aircraft carrier  for "Operation M" (the Japanese invasion of the Philippines).

From early January 1942, Shiokaze was based at Cam Ranh Bay, French Indochina supporting the invasions of the British protectorate of Sarawak on Borneo, "Operation L" (the invasion of Palembang) and "Operation J" (the invasion of Java) in the Netherlands East Indies. On 2 March 1942 she assisted  in sinking the Dutch auxiliary minesweeper Endeh. Later in March, she participated with Ryūjō in the Invasion of the Andaman Islands and the Indian Ocean raids. On 10 April 1942, Shiokaze was reassigned to the IJN 5th Fleet and participated in "Operation AL" (the invasion of the Aleutian Islands. She was reassigned back to the Southwest Area Fleet in August, escorting convoys between Japan and Taiwan.

After repairs in early 1943, Shiokaze began escorting convoys between Japan and Manila, Singapore and Palau, continuing in this duty to the end of January 1945.  She suffered minor damage on 31 January 1945 when attacked south of Taiwan attempting to evacuate aircraft crews from Aparri on Luzon, returning to Kure Naval Arsenal for repairs. However, repairs were never completed, and Shiokaze was still docked at Kure at the time of the surrender of Japan.

After the war, Shiokaze was used as a reparation vessel, evacuating demobilized Japanese troops from the Asian continent back to Japan. On 5 October 1945 Shiokaze was removed from navy list. She was later scuttled to form part of the breakwater at Onahama Port, Fukushima prefecture.

References

Notes

Books

External links
 
 
 

Minekaze-class destroyers
Ships built by Maizuru Naval Arsenal
1920 ships
Second Sino-Japanese War naval ships of Japan
World War II destroyers of Japan
Maritime incidents in 1928
Maritime incidents in January 1945
Scuttled vessels
Shipwrecks of Japan